Godson Ominibie Epelle (born 27 June 1994), known professionally as 1Da Banton, is a Nigerian singer, songwriter and record producer. He is best known for his song "No Wahala", first released in 2021, and re-released in 2022 as a remix featuring Kizz Daniel and Tiwa Savage.

Background and career 
1Da Banton was born and raised in Port Harcourt, Rivers State. He was pursuing a degree in civil engineering before he decided to drop out and begin his music career. He relocated to Lagos in 2014 after signing a deal with Adasa Cookey's Squareball Entertainment.

In July 2017, he released his debut extended play (EP) titled The Banton EP.  One of the EP's songs, "Way Up", was used as the theme song for the third season of Big Brother Naija. He gained Global recognition after the release of "No Wahala", which was one of the tracks on his album Original Vibe Machine, released in 2021. The US Secretary of State Antony Blinken listed the song among his 2021 Spotify playlist favorite songs of the year.

In 2022, 1Da Banton released a remix of "No Wahala" which featured Kizz Daniel and Tiwa Savage. He has also collaborated with Jamaican singer Kranium, Ghanaian dancehall musician Stonebwoy, and Nigerian artists Zlatan, Seyi Shay and Blaqbonez.

Discography 
Studio albums
Original Vibe Machine (2021)

Extended plays
The Banton EP (2017)

Singles
"Love Her Daily" (2016)
"Farabale" (2019)
"Whine fi Mi" (featuring Kranium) (2019)
"Foreigner" (2020)
"African Woman" (2020)
"Same Girl" (2020)
"Shenor" (2020)
"No Wahala" (2021)
"No Wahala" (remix) (featuring Kizz Daniel and Tiwa Savage) (2022)
"Summer Love" (2022)

As featured artist
"Faaji" – Blaqbonez featuring Bad Boy Timz and 1Da Banton (Sex Over Love, 2021)

Awards and nominations 
The Beatz Awards 2021

Selected production credits 
"Barrawo" by Ajebo hustlers 

"Barrawo" (remix) by Ajebo hustlers featuring Davido

References 

Nigerian artists
Nigerian musicians
21st-century Nigerian musicians
Musicians from Port Harcourt
Singers from Port Harcourt
People from Port Harcourt
1994 births
Living people
Musicians from Rivers State